Tim Sweeney may refer to:

 Tim Sweeney (disc jockey), disc jockey and host of Beats in Space
 Tim Sweeney (game developer) (born 1970), game developer and founder of Epic Games
 Tim Sweeney (ice hockey) (born 1967), American ice hockey player
 Tim Sweeney (hurler) (1929–2018), Irish hurler who played for Galway
 Tim Sweeney (baseball) (born 1980), American baseball player for Washington Nationals